Ionuț Boșneag (born 15 February 1982) is a Romanian former footballer who played as a goalkeeper for teams such as: Argeș Pitești, Universitatea Cluj, Oțelul Galați, UTA Arad and Astra Giurgiu, among others.

Honours

Argeș Pitești
Liga II: 2007–08

Astra Giurgiu
Liga I: 2015–16
Supercupa României: 2016

External links
 
 

1982 births
Living people
Sportspeople from Pitești
Romanian footballers
Association football goalkeepers
Liga I players
Liga II players
CS Mioveni players
FC Argeș Pitești players
FC Universitatea Cluj players
ASC Oțelul Galați players
LPS HD Clinceni players
FC Astra Giurgiu players